Arfaptin-1 is a protein that in humans is encoded by the ARFIP1 gene.

Interactions
ARFIP1 has been shown to interact with ARF3.

References

Further reading

External links